Events in the year 1903 in Portugal.

Incumbents
Monarch: Carlos I
President of the Council of Ministers: Ernesto Hintze Ribeiro

Events

2 April – Edward VII of the United Kingdom arrives in Lisbon on a state visit.
1 August – Boavista F.C. is founded as 'The Boavista Footballers' by British expatriates in Porto.

Births
12 October – Júlio Botelho Moniz, soldier and politician (d. 1970).

References

 
Portugal
Years of the 20th century in Portugal
Portugal